McCorkle is a surname. Notable people with the surname include:

Chantal McCorkle (born 1968), American fraudster; wife of William J. McCorkle
David Porter McCorkle (1862–1871), American military officer
George McCorkle (1947–2007), American guitarist and songwriter
Jill McCorkle (born 1958), American short story writer, novelist, and educator
Joseph W. McCorkle (1819–1884), American politician
Kelly McCorkle (born 1979), American beauty contest titleholder
Margit L. McCorkle (born 1942), American-born Canadian musicologist, music bibliographer, editor, translator, pianist, and harpsichordist
Mark McCorkle (born 1967), American screenwriter and producer
Matt McCorkle (born ?), American sound artist, sound designer, and audio engineer
Paul McCorkle (1863–1934), American politician and cotton broker
Ruth McCorkle (born 1941), American nursing professor, writer, researcher, and oncology pioneer
Sam McCorkle (born 1949), American football coach
Samuel Eusebius McCorkle (1746–1811), American pioneer Presbyterian preacher, teacher, and education advocate
Sean McCorkle (born 1976), American mixed martial artist
Susannah McCorkle (1946–2001), American jazz singer
William J. McCorkle (born 1966), American fraudster; husband of Chantal McCorkle

In fiction
Will McCorkle, a character on American television show Party of Five (1994–2000)

See also
Doc Corkle (1952), an American television sitcom